The Akassa tribe (Akasa, Akaha) of the Ijaw people lives along the Nun River estuary and the Atlantic Coast of southern Bayelsa State, Nigeria. Akassa settlements include: Opu-Akassa, Sangana, and Kamatoru.

See also
Akassa

References

External links
The Akassa Development Foundation 

Ijaw
Bayelsa State